Saint-Robert (Limousin: Sent Robèrt) is a commune in the Corrèze department in central France.

Population

See also
Communes of the Corrèze department

References

Communes of Corrèze
Plus Beaux Villages de France
Corrèze communes articles needing translation from French Wikipedia